Paul Friedrich August Ascherson (June 4, 1834 – March 6, 1913) was a German botanist. His author citation is Asch., although Aschers. has been used in the past.

Ascherson was born in Berlin in 1834 as the son of health counsellor. In 1850, he started studying medicine at the University of Berlin, but soon started getting more interested in botany. In 1855, he received his doctorate for a dissertation about the flora of the Margraviate of Brandenburg. In the 1850s, he started to botanize in Saxony, including several excursions with Ludwig Schneider and Gustav Maass. In 1860, Ascherson became an assistant at the Botanical Garden in Berlin; in 1865 he also started working at the Royal Herbarium. In 1863, he obtained his habilitation for specific botany and plant geography. In 1873, Ascherson became associate professor at the University of Berlin. He accompanied Friedrich Gerhard Rohlfs on his 1873/74 expedition in the Libyan desert. After 1876, he went on further expeditions in Africa, publishing fundamental works about the flora of the continent. In the 1890s he botanized in Jerichower Land and in the Vorharz along with Paul Graebner.

Ascherson is known for combining works about the flora in certain localities with his own observations to write descriptions of the flora of a larger territory. He was also an entomologist. Insect collections made by him in Africa are conserved in Museum für Naturkunde in Berlin.

In 1848 botanist Mont. published Aschersonia>, which is a genus of fungi in the order Hypocreales and family Clavicipitaceae. and named in Ascherson's honour.

Works 
 Flora der Provinz Brandenburg, der Altmark und des Herzogthums Magdeburg. Zum gebrauche in schulen und auf excursionen. Berlin, August Hirschwald, 1864
 Catalogus cormophytorum et anthophytorum Serbiae, Bosniae, Hercegovinae, Montis Scodri, Albaniae hucusque cognitorum. Claudiopoli, Typ. N.K. Papp, 1877
 Synopsis der mitteleuropaïschen Flora.  Leipzig : W. Engelmann, 1896
 Flora des nordostdeutschen flachlandes (ausser Ostpreussen). Berlin, Gebrüder Borntraeger, 1898–99
 Nordostdeutsche Schulflora : Tabellen zur Bestimmung der wildwachsenden und der häufiger angebauten Blüten- und Farnpflanzen der Provinzen Brandenburg, Pommern, Posen, Ost- und Westpreussen, und Sachsen (Nordhälfte), der Grossherzogtümer Mecklenburg und des Herzogtums Anhalt nach der Flora des nordostdeutschen Flachlandes. Berlin : Borntraeger, 1902
 Potamogetonaceae. Leipzig : Engelmann, 1907

Notes

References
 Grünzel, Hermann: Ascherson, Paul  Friedrich August  in Magdeburger Biographisches Lexikon. Retrieved August 27, 2007.

19th-century German botanists
German entomologists
Scientists from Berlin
Academic staff of the Humboldt University of Berlin
1834 births
1913 deaths